David L. Steward (born July 2, 1951) is an American billionaire businessman. He is chairman and founder of World Wide Technology, one of the largest African-American-owned businesses in America.

According to Forbes, in 2019 Steward was one of 13 black billionaires worldwide. He was ranked 239th on the Forbes 400 list of American billionaires in 2019.

Early life

Steward was born in Chicago, Illinois, the son of Dorothy Elizabeth Massingale (1928 - present), a homemaker, and Harold Lloyd Steward (1925-1999), a mechanic. In 1953, the family moved to Clinton, Missouri. As a child growing up in Clinton, Steward faced poverty and discrimination.

"I vividly remember segregation—separate schools, sitting in the balcony at the movie theater, being barred from the public swimming pool," notes Steward, who was among a small group of African-American high-school students who integrated the public swimming pool in Clinton in 1967.

Steward received his BS degree in business from Central Missouri State University in 1973.

Business career
After graduating from college, Steward worked at Wagner Electric as a production manager (1974–1975), a sales representative at Missouri Pacific Railroad Company (1975–1979), and a senior account executive at Federal Express (1979–1984), where he was recognized as salesman of the year and inducted into the company's hall of fame in 1981.  He owned Transportation Business Specialists and Transport Administrative Services in the years leading up to founding World Wide Technology. He is also a founder of Telcobuy, a global technology and supply chain management company.

World Wide Technology
In 1990, Steward founded World Wide Technology, a systems integrator. In 1993, WWT concentrated its focus on the implementation of enterprise wide imaging, conversion services, and telecommunication networks.

In 1999 World Wide Technology spun off its telecommunications division to form Telcobuy.com. Sales for the two companies continued to grow, although revenues slipped in 2002 as World Wide Technology felt the impact of the technology recession. In 2003 combined reported revenues passed $1 billion, and Steward formed World Wide Technology Holding Company as the parent company for the two firms.

World Wide Technology's 2018 revenue is estimated to be greater than $11 billion, which would rank it as one of St. Louis' largest private companies.

Publications
Doing Business by the Good Book (with Robert L. Shook)

Civic and community involvement

Steward has served on committees and boards that include: Civic Progress of St. Louis; the St. Louis Regional Chamber and Growth Association; Missouri Technology Corporation, appointed by the Governor of Missouri; Webster University; BJC Health System; First Banks, Inc.; St. Louis Science Center; United Way of Greater St. Louis; The Greater St. Louis Area Council of Boy Scouts of America and Harris-Stowe State College African-American Business Leadership Council. In 2011, Steward was appointed to the Board of Curators, University of Missouri by Governor Jay Nixon, although he resigned before his term was through.

Honors

100 Leaders for the Millennium, St. Louis Business Journal, 2000
100+ Most Influential Black Americans - Ebony magazine 
14th Best American Entrepreneur, Success Magazine, 1998
Business Person of the Year for Missouri, Small Business Administration
Company of the Year, Black Enterprise, 1999
Entrepreneur of the Year, Black Enterprise, 2000
Ernst & Young Entrepreneur of the Year, 1998
Five time winner, Fast 50 Awards
Granville T. Woods Award for Outstanding CEO, 1997
Minority Small Business Person of the Year, Small Business Administration, 1997, 1998
Phoenix Award, St. Louis Minority Business Council, 2000
Small Business Association Hall of Fame, 2001
The American Marketing Association 1996 Distinguished Executive
Top 100 Industrial/Service Companies, Black Enterprise, 11th in 1998, 6th in 1999, 1st in 2000 and 2001
Top 100 List of St. Louis Leaders, 2002 
Top Minority Entrepreneur, Small Business Administration, 1998
Black Engineer of the Year, BEYA STEM Conference, 2012
Horatio Alger Award, Horatio Alger Association of Distinguished Americans, 2014
Silver Buffalo Award, Boy Scouts of America

References

External links
 Mizzouweekly.missouri.edu
 Wwt.com

1951 births
African-American billionaires
American business writers
American chief executives
Businesspeople from Chicago
Businesspeople in software
Internet pioneers
Living people
People from Clinton, Missouri
University of Central Missouri alumni
African-American company founders
American company founders
21st-century African-American people
20th-century African-American people